Sayago is a barrio (neighbourhood or district) of Montevideo, Uruguay.

Location
This barrio borders Conciliación to the northwest, Peñarol - Lavalleja to the northeast, Paso de las Duranas to the southeast and  Belvedere to the southwest.

History
It was founded in 1873 and was declared a "Pueblo" (village) on 10 March 1913 by the Act of Ley N° 4.311. On 1 July 1953, its status was elevated to "Villa" (town) by the Act of Ley N° 11.966. Eventually, it has been integrated to Montevideo.

Places of worship
 Our Lady of Lebanon Church (Eastern Catholic, Maronite)

See also 
Barrios of Montevideo

References

External links 
 Revista Raíces/ Historia del barrio Sayago

Barrios of Montevideo